Chaplin: His Life and Art is a 1985 book (revised second edition 2001) by film critic David Robinson which examines the life and works of Sir Charlie Chaplin. The British Film Institute describe the book as Chaplin's "definitive biography ... impeccably researched, well written and full of detail." Along with Chaplin's 1964 book My Autobiography, it was used as source material for the 1992 film Chaplin.

First edition
McGraw-Hill, 1985,

References

1985 non-fiction books
Books about film
Biographies adapted into films
Charlie Chaplin
Books about actors